, known professionally as Hiromi, is a Japanese jazz composer and pianist. She is known for her virtuosic technique, energetic live performances and blend of musical genres such as stride, post-bop, progressive rock, classical and fusion in her compositions.

Biography 
Uehara was born in Hamamatsu, Japan. She started learning piano at the age of six and was introduced to jazz by her piano teacher Noriko Hikida when she was eight. At age 14, she played with the Czech Philharmonic Orchestra. When she was 17 years old, she met Chick Corea by chance in Tokyo and was invited to play with him at his concert the next day. After being a jingle writer for a few years for Japanese companies such as Nissan, she enrolled to study at Berklee College of Music in Boston, Massachusetts. There, she was mentored by Ahmad Jamal and had already signed with jazz label Telarc before her graduation.

She debuted in 2003 with her album, Another Mind, and has toured and appeared in jazz festivals regularly since then. She formed an initial trio with bassist Mitch Cohn and drummer Dave DiCenso, and in 2004, she recorded her second album Brain with fellow Berklee alumni bassist Tony Grey and drummer Martin Valihora, as well as bassist Anthony Jackson, who was a guest on three tracks.  She continued to record and tour with Grey and Valihora until 2009. On October 19, 2006, the trio added guitarist David Fiuczynski in a performance at the Jazz Factory in Louisville, Kentucky, to form Hiromi's Sonicbloom. Fiuczynski is also featured in the albums Time Control (2007) and Beyond Standard (2008). Due to Fiuczynski's teaching commitments at Berklee, guitarist John Shannon performed with the group when Fiuczynski was unavailable.

Drummer Mauricio Zottarelli joined Hiromi's Sonicbloom for the 2009 tour. Uehara also performed at the Newport Jazz Festival on August 8, 2009, and at the Paris Olympia in Paris on April 13, 2010, and toured in the summer of 2010 with the Stanley Clarke Band.

Anthony Jackson, who was previously a guest on the Brain album, joined Uehara along with drummer Simon Phillips as part of the Trio Project for the 2011 album Voice. The Trio Project went on to make the albums Move (2012), Alive (2014), and Spark (2016). Spark reached the number one position on the US Billboard Jazz Albums chart for the week of April 23, 2016.

In 2021 she performed at the opening ceremony of the 2020 Tokyo Olympics.

Instruments 
In a 2010 interview, Uehara said she plays the Yamaha CFIII-S concert grand piano, Nord Lead 2, Clavia Nord Electro 2 73, Clavia Nord Stage Piano, and Korg microKORG.

Personal life 
Uehara married Japanese fashion designer Mihara Yasuhiro in 2007.  They met after she performed at one of his fashion shows in Milan the year before.

Discography

Studio albums 
 Another Mind (Telarc Jazz, 2003) – rec. 2002
 Brain (Telarc Jazz, 2004) – rec. 2003
 Spiral (Telarc Jazz, 2006) – rec. 2005
 Hiromi's Sonicbloom, Time Control (Telarc Jazz, 2007) – rec. 2006
 Hiromi's Sonicbloom, Beyond Standard (Telarc Jazz, 2008)
 Place to Be (Telarc Jazz, 2009)
 The Trio Project, Voice (Telarc Jazz, 2011)
 The Trio Project, Move (Telarc Jazz, 2012)
 The Trio Project. Alive (Telarc Jazz, 2014)
 The Trio Project, Spark (Telarc Jazz, 2016)
 Spectrum (Telarc Jazz, 2019)
 Hiromi The Piano Quintet, Silver Lining Suite (Universal Music Classic, 2021)

Live  albums 
 Hiromi's Sonicbloom Live in Concert (2007)[DVD-Video]
  with Chick Corea (Stretch, 2008)[2CD] - live rec. 2007 at Blue Note Tokyo
 Hiromi Live in Concert (2009)[DVD-Video] – rec. 2005
 Duet with Chick Corea (2009)[DVD-Video] - rec. 2007. released in Japan only.
 Solo Live at Blue Note New York (2011) - rec. 2010 at Blue Note Jazz Club
 The Trio Project, Hiromi: Live in Marciac (2012)[DVD-Video]
 Move: Live in Tokyo (2014)[DVD-Video]

Other appearances
 The Stanley Clarke Trio featuring Hiromi and Lenny White, Jazz in the Garden (Heads Up, 2009)
 Flashback, Triangle Soundtrack (BMG Japan, 2009)
 Tokyo Ska Paradise Orchestra, Goldfingers (cutting edge, 2010)
 The Stanley Clarke Band featuring Hiromi, The Stanley Clarke Band (Heads Up, 2010) - in "No Mystery", "Larry Has Traveled 11 Miles and Waited a Lifetime for the Return of Vishnu's Report", "Labyrinth" and "Sonny Rollins"
 Akiko Yano and Hiromi, Get Together – Live in Tokyo (Universal, 2011)
 Tokyo Ska Paradise Orchestra, Walkin''' (cutting edge, 2012)
 Kelly Peterson, Oscar, With Love (Two Lions, 2015) - reissued (Mack Avenue, 2017) in "Take Me Home' and 'Oscar's New Camera"
 Akiko Yano and Hiromi, Ramen-na Onnatachi (Universal, 2017)
 Hiromi & Edmar Castañeda, Live in Montreal (Telarc, 2017)

 Filmography Blue Giant'' (Music, 2023)

References

External links 

 
 
 
 

1979 births
21st-century pianists
21st-century Japanese women musicians
Berklee College of Music alumni
Women jazz composers
Grammy Award winners
Hosei University alumni
Japanese jazz composers
Japanese jazz pianists
Japanese women in electronic music
Japanese women pianists
Jazz fusion pianists
Living people
Musicians from Shizuoka Prefecture
People from Hamamatsu
Ragtime composers
Women jazz pianists
21st-century women pianists